Coloncus is a genus of North American dwarf spiders that was first described by Ralph Vary Chamberlin in 1949.

Species
 it contains five species:
Coloncus americanus (Chamberlin & Ivie, 1944) – USA
Coloncus cascadeus Chamberlin, 1949 – USA
Coloncus ocala Chamberlin, 1949 – USA
Coloncus pius Chamberlin, 1949 (type) – USA
Coloncus siou Chamberlin, 1949 – USA, Canada

See also
 List of Linyphiidae species

References

Araneomorphae genera
Linyphiidae
Spiders of North America